Cyclic Poets is a shorthand term for the early Greek epic poets, approximate contemporaries of Homer. No more is known about these poets than about Homer, but modern scholars regard them as having composed orally, as did Homer. In the classical period, surviving early epic poems were ascribed to these authors, just as the Iliad and Odyssey were ascribed to Homer. Together with Homer, whose Iliad covers a mere 50 days of the war, they cover the complete war "cycle", thus the name. Most modern scholars place Homer in the 8th century BC. The other poets listed below seemed to have lived in the 7th–5th centuries BC. Excluding Homer's, none of the works of the cyclic poets survive.

List of named poets 
Homer
Stasinus of Cyprus
Creophylus of Samos 
Panyassis of Halicarnassus
Arctinus of Miletus
Lesches of Pyrrha
Cinaethon of Sparta
Thestorides of Phocaea (the pseudo-Herodotean Life of Homer says that Thestorides used writing)
Antimachus of Teos
Eumelus of Corinth
Agias of Troezen
Diodorus of Erythrae
Hegesias of Salamis (or Hegesinus)
Cyprias of Halicarnassus
Carcinus of Naupactus
Prodicus of Phocaea
Eugammon of Cyrene
Pisinous of Lindus
Pisander of Camirus

List of early Greek epics

The Epic Cycle

Cypria, ascribed to Homer or Stasinus of Cyprus or Hegesinus (or Hegesias) of Salamis or Cyprias of Halicarnassus 
Iliad, nearly always ascribed to Homer
Aethiopis, ascribed to Arctinus of Miletus
Amazonia once ascribed to Homer (perhaps a different version of or another name for Aethiopis)
Little Iliad, ascribed to Lesches of Pyrrha or Cinaethon of Sparta or Diodorus of Erythrae or Homer
Sack of Troy, ascribed to Arctinus of Miletus
Return from Troy, ascribed to Eumelus of Corinth or Agias of Troezen or Homer
Odyssey, usually ascribed to Homer
Telegony, ascribed to Cinaethon of Sparta; otherwise said to have been stolen from Musaeus by Eugammon of Cyrene
Thesprotis (perhaps a different version of or another name for Telegony)

The Theban Cycle

Oedipodea, ascribed to Cinaethon of Sparta
Thebaid, sometimes ascribed to Homer
Epigoni, ascribed to Antimachus of Teos or Homer
Alcmeonis

Other epics
Titanomachy, ascribed to Eumelus of Corinth
Heracleia, said to have been stolen from Pisinous of Lindus by Pisander of Camirus
Capture of Oechalia, said to have been given by Homer to Creophylus of Samos
Naupactia, ascribed to Arctinus of Miletus or Carcinus of Naupactus
Phocais, ascribed to Thestorides of Phocaea or Homer
Minyas, ascribed to Prodicus of Phocaea
Danais or Danaides
Europia, perhaps also called Bougonia, ascribed to Eumelus of Corinth

Bibliography 
West, Martin L. Greek Epic Fragments. Cambridge, Massachusetts: Harvard University Press, 2003.

8th-century BC poets
7th-century BC poets
6th-century BC poets
5th-century BC poets
Ancient Greek epic poetry
Homer
Cyclic Poets
Cyclic Poets